Heilprinia dowiana is a species of sea snail, a marine gastropod mollusk in the family Fasciolariidae, the spindle snails, the tulip snails and their allies.

Description

Distribution
This species occurs in the Gulf of Mexico off Honduras.

References

 Vermeij G.J. & Snyder M.A. (2018). Proposed genus-level classification of large species of Fusininae (Gastropoda, Fasciolariidae). Basteria. 82(4-6): 57-82
 Callomon P. & Snyder M.A. (2019). The genus Fusinus in the northwestern Pacific. Special Publication of the Malacological Society of Japan. 4: 1-122. page(s): figs 1a-b

External links
 Olsson A.A. (1954). A new Heilprinia from the Gulf of Mexico. The Nautilus. 67(4): 105-107, pl. 8

dowiana
Gastropods described in 1954